Pediasia lidiella is a moth in the family Crambidae. It was described by Alexander N. Streltzov and Petr Ya. Ustjuzhanin in 2009. It is found in Russia, where it has been recorded from Transbaikalia.

References

Crambini
Moths described in 2009
Moths of Asia